Elections to the Council of the Isles of Scilly, a sui generis unitary authority in the far southwest of England, were held on 4 June 2009.

The whole council of 21 members was up for election, with thirteen members elected in the St Mary's electoral division and another eight from the 'Off Islands', being two each from Bryher, St Martin's, St Agnes and Tresco. All eight seats for the 'Off Islands' were uncontested.

As with other unitary elections in England, these local elections in the Isles of Scilly took place on the same day as the European elections of 2009. The previous election, in 2005, coincided with the 2005 United Kingdom general election.

Results

|}

By ward

|}

|}

|}

|}

|}

External links

Election results for St Mary's, 2009 at Isles of Scilly Council web site
Uncontested results, 2009 at Isles of Scilly Council web site

2009
2009 English local elections
2000s in Cornwall